Wiley P. Harris (born Wiley Pope Harris; November 9, 1818 – December 3, 1891) was a U.S. Representative from Mississippi.

Biography
Born on November 9, 1818, in Pike County, Mississippi, Harris attended the common schools and the University of Virginia in Charlottesville. He was graduated from the law department of Transylvania College, Lexington, Kentucky, in 1840. He was admitted to the bar in 1840 and commenced practice in Gallatin, Mississippi. He was Circuit judge of the second district from 1844 to 1850 and served as member of the State constitutional conventions in 1850, 1861, and 1890.

Harris was elected as a Democrat to the Thirty-third Congress (March 4, 1853 – March 3, 1855). He declined to be a candidate for renomination in 1854. He resumed the practice of law in Jackson, Mississippi. He served as member of the Provisional Congress of the Confederate States in 1861. He continued the practice of law in Jackson, and died there on December 3, 1891. He was interred in Greenwood Cemetery.

References

External links
 
 
 Wiley P. Harris at The Political Graveyard

1818 births
1891 deaths
People from Pike County, Mississippi
Democratic Party members of the United States House of Representatives from Mississippi
Signers of the Provisional Constitution of the Confederate States
Signers of the Confederate States Constitution
Mississippi state court judges
Mississippi lawyers
Transylvania University alumni
People of Mississippi in the American Civil War
Burials in Mississippi
19th-century American judges
19th-century American lawyers